The  are a Japanese women's softball team based in Oguchi, Aichi. The Cherry Blossoms compete in the Japan Diamond Softball League (JD.League) as a member of the league's West Division.

History
The Cherry Blossoms were founded in 1979, as Tokai Rika softball team.

The Japan Diamond Softball League (JD.League) was founded in 2022, and the Cherry Blossoms became part of the new league as a member of the West Division.

Roster

References

External links
 
 Tokai Rika Cherry Blossoms - JD.League
 
 

Japan Diamond Softball League
Women's softball teams in Japan
Sports teams in Aichi Prefecture